B-cell lymphoma/leukemia 11B is a protein that in humans is encoded by the BCL11B gene.

Gene location 
BCL11B is located on human chromosome 14p32.2. The mouse analogue is called Rit1 or Bcl11b and is located on mouse chromosome 12.

Function 

This gene encodes a C2H2-type zinc finger protein and is closely related to BCL11A, a gene whose translocation may be associated with B-cell malignancies. The specific function of this gene has not yet been determined, but it could also be involved in some malignancies. Two alternatively spliced transcript variants, which encode distinct isoforms, have been reported.

Research suggests that BCL11B is crucial for ameloblasts (the cells that produce tooth enamel) to form and work properly.

Interactions 

BCL11B has been shown to interact with COUP-TFI.

Pathology 
BCL11B is closely connected with immune regulation and for so its mutation can lead to a SCID phenotype. This so-called Immunodeficiency 49 (OMIM #617237) is classified as T-B+NK+ SCID. It is characterised by a lack of T lymphocytes and its malfunctioning specifically in proliferative response. On the other hand, B cells and NK cells counts and functions are not impaired. The symptoms of SCID caused by BCL11B mutation  - apart from immunity defects - typically include teeth abnormalities, craniofacial dimorphism, different types of dermatitis. As well the intellectual development is significantly impaired. The disease has a very early onset and the only known treatment is hematopoietic stem cell transplantation from a healthy donor. The immunodeficiency has a dominant negative mode of inheritance as all so far described patients with it has been after sequencing identified as heterozygotes in the BCL11B gene.

Research projects 
A mouse model based study showed, that Bcl11b also plays an important role in pathogenesis of inflammatory bowel disease. Bcl11b gene knock-out in certain T cell population led to development of IBD. The mechanisms behind are supposed to be reduced suppressor activity of T regulatory cells and changes in cytokine environment. Bcl11b is suspected to interact with Foxp3 and IL10 gene promoters and thus impair its suppressive function in the intestines.

Bcl11b (mouse analogue of human BCL11B) has been proven to contribute to malignant growth for example in case of mouse lymphomas. That is suspected to be caused by interaction with p53, a well-known tumor suppressor gene.

References

Further reading

External links 
 
 
 
 

Transcription factors